James Karl Luck (October 1, 1891 – September 27, 1971) was an American football and basketball coach. He served as the head football coach (1922–1924) and head men's basketball coach (1923–1925) at East Tennessee State University.

Luck lettered as a fullback for the Tennessee Volunteers football team in 1915 and 1916.

Head coaching record

References

External links
 

1891 births
1971 deaths
American football fullbacks
East Tennessee State Buccaneers football coaches
East Tennessee State Buccaneers men's basketball coaches
Tennessee Volunteers football players